The Dreamer is an oil on panel painting of c. 1712–1717 in the Art Institute, Chicago, by the French Rococo artist Antoine Watteau. The painting is a single-figure, full-length composition that shows a seated young woman amid a landscape, dressed in somewhat an exotic attire consisting of long red gown with fur garment and white bonnet; it is a recurring subject that is also present in numerous paintings and drawings by Watteau such as The Coquettes, dit Actors of the Comédie-Française. There were attempts to identify the sitter of the painting, who was notably thought to be Watteau's contemporary, the Comédie-Française actress Charlotte Desmares.

In the early 18th century, The Dreamer belonged to the Abbé Pierre-Maurice Haranger, canon at the Saint-Germain l'Auxerrois who was one of Watteau's closest friends. During two centuries, the painting passed through various private collections, until coming into possession of the art dealer and connoisseur Georges Wildenstein, who sold it to the Art Institute of Chicago in 1960.

Exhibition history

Further reading

External links
 The Dreamer at the Art Institute of Chicago official website

Paintings by Antoine Watteau
1710s paintings
Paintings in the collection of the Art Institute of Chicago
Portraits of women